Butter Miracle is an EP by Counting Crows. "Elevator Boots" was released as the first single for the four-track EP in April 2021, described by Rolling Stone as "a melodic, wistful ode to life on tour, with a sound that somehow manages to bridge the gap between The Band and Mott the Hoople." The full EP, titled Butter Miracle, Suite One, was released on May 21, 2021. A second EP, Butter Miracle, Suite Two, will be released and together form a full album.

Background and recording
Adam Duritz spent a lot of time in England in 2019 and started writing songs for a new album.  When the band ran into a pandemic they were 85% done with the record. The record was later finished in July 2020.

Track listing
The vinyl version features the song ‘August and Everything After’ on the B side.

References

2021 EPs
Counting Crows albums
BMG Rights Management albums
Albums impacted by the COVID-19 pandemic